The coco sea catfish (Bagre bagre) is a species of sea catfish in the family Ariidae. It was described by Carl Linnaeus in 1776, originally under the genus Silurus. It inhabits tropical marine and brackish waters ranging between Colombia and the Amazon River, in South America.

The diet of the coco sea catfish includes bony fish and benthic crustaceans. It is preyed on by the smalltail shark. It is of commercial interest to fisheries, and is marketed fresh.

References

coco sea catfish
Fish of Costa Rica
Fish of Panama
Fish of Colombia
Fish of Venezuela
Fish of Guyana
Fish of Suriname
Fish of Brazil
coco sea catfish
Taxa named by Carl Linnaeus